Pietermaritzburg Airport  is the primary airport serving the city of Pietermaritzburg and surrounding areas, including the Midlands and the outer west areas of Durban. Pietermaritzburg Airport is the only airport in the greater Pietermaritzburg area that offers scheduled passenger services. In 2013 the terminal building and apron were upgraded.

In 2020, Pietermaritzburg Airport was one of the few airports authorised to open for domestic travel by the South African government in relation to the relaxing of COVID-19 lockdown measures.

Airline and destination

Aeronautical information

Navigational aids

Communication
Communication Frequency 122.0 MHz

Notes
The airport has Pilot Controlled night landing facilities. The lights are normally off and are switched on for a period of 15 minutes when Aircrew transmit 5 or 7 clicks in rapid succession on the communication frequency, depending on the intensity required (30% or 100%). Cloud break procedures are authorised onto runways 16 and 34, the procedures are fairly complicated due to the hilly terrain surrounding the airport.

Other activities at the airfield
There is an Aero-club on the airfield (Called "Pietermaritzburg Aero" Club).

Traffic statistics

References

Airports in South Africa
Buildings and structures in Pietermaritzburg
Transport in KwaZulu-Natal